Trichosanthes pilosa is a tropical or semitropical vine bearing an edible fruit. It is native to Japan, Taiwan, India, Malaysia, Vietnam, the Philippines, China (Guangdong, Guangxi, Hainan, Hunan, Jiangxi, Sichuan, Xizang (Tibet), Zhejiang) and other parts of southeast Asia as well as in Australia. It is known in English as Japanese snake gourd.

The Japanese snake gourd (T. pilosa), is very similar in its vegetative characters to the more widespread "snake gourd", Trichosanthes cucumerina, the flower and leaves of the two species are very similar but the fruit of T. pilosa are round to egg-shaped, about 7 cm long and not resembling a snake.

Notes

References

pilosa
Fruit vegetables
Plants described in 1873
Flora of Australia
Flora of China
Flora of tropical Asia
Edible plants